The seventh and final season of The Good Wife was ordered on May 11, 2015, by CBS. It premiered on October 4, 2015, on CBS and consisted of 22 episodes. A promotional advertisement for the series that aired during Super Bowl 50 announced that the seventh season would be its last.

Premise

The series focuses on Alicia Florrick (Margulies), whose husband Peter (Noth), the former Cook County, Illinois State's Attorney, has been jailed following a notorious political corruption and sex scandal. After having spent the previous thirteen years as a stay-at-home mother, Alicia returns to the workforce as a litigator to provide for her two children.

Cast

Main
 Julianna Margulies as Alicia Florrick
 Matt Czuchry as Cary Agos
 Alan Cumming as Eli Gold
 Cush Jumbo as Lucca Quinn
 Makenzie Vega as Grace Florrick
 Zach Grenier as David Lee
 Graham Phillips as Zach Florrick
 Jeffrey Dean Morgan as Jason Crouse
 Christine Baranski as Diane Lockhart

Recurring
 Margo Martindale as Ruth Eastman
 Chris Noth as Peter Florrick
 Jerry Adler as Howard Lyman
 Christopher McDonald as Judge Don Schakowsky
 Nicole Roderick as Nora
 Michael J. Fox as Louis Canning
 Sarah Steele as Marissa Gold
 Nikki M. James as Monica Timmons
 Mary Beth Peil as Jackie Florrick
 Chris Butler as Matan Brody
 Will Patton as Mike Tascioni
 Matthew Morrison as Connor Fox
 Vanessa L. Williams as Courtney Paige
 Stockard Channing as Veronica Loy
 Mike Pniewski as Frank Landau
 Peter Gallagher as Ethan Carver
 Brian Muller as Brian Carter
 Rob Bartlett as Bernie Bukovitz
 Dallas Roberts as Owen Cavanaugh
 Gary Cole as Kurt McVeigh
 Kurt Fuller as Judge Peter Dunaway
 Dominic Chianese as Judge Michael Marx
 Mo Rocca as Ted Willoughby
 Megan Hilty as Holly Westfall
 David Paymer as Judge Richard Cuesta

Guest
 Christian Borle as Carter Schmidt
 Amy Irving as Phyllis Barsetto
 Mamie Gummer as Nancy Crozier
 Bridget Regan as Madeline Smulders
 David Krumholtz as Josh Mariner
 John Benjamin Hickey as Neil Gross
 Joey Slotnick as Anthony Dudewitz
 Patrick Breen as Captain Terrence Hicks
 Carrie Preston as Elsbeth Tascioni
 Denis O'Hare as Judge Charles Abernathy
 Anna Camp as Caitlyn D'Arcy
 Zach Woods as Jeff Dellinger
 Renée Elise Goldsberry as Geneva Pine
 Josh Charles as Will Gardner

Episodes

Reception
The seventh season of The Good Wife received positive reviews. The review aggregator website Rotten Tomatoes reports a 100% certified fresh rating based on 21 reviews. The website's consensus reads, "Reinvigorated storylines and an even stronger cast keep The Good Wife fresh in its seventh season - and away from the doldrums that overcome many long-running dramas."

However, like the latter part of season six where viewer ratings fell precipitously, the seventh season has received criticism for the "incredibly uneven [plotting], sucking so much of the vitality and urgency out of the show". Variety noted that in season seven that "there were notably more of subplots and segues that were, at best, time-fillers and at worst, eyeroll-inducing" and said it "was obvious that it was time for the show to go". TV.com observed that "obituaries for the show were already burying it instead of praising it, pointing to where it all went wrong, or that it wasn't even truly that great to begin with. An episode like "End" solidified a lot of those arguments. Hell, it solidified a lot of my arguments about this season being a grab bag of ideas." Similar to how Kalinda Sharma was sidelined in season six, which led to her departure, season seven main characters like Cary Agos and Diane Lockhart lacked compelling storylines to the point where they almost became irrelevant. With the departure of male lead Josh Charles (who played Will Gardner) in season five, the show's "writers really struggled to rebuild that same type of long-term emotional storytelling. His departure left a gap that was never fully filled again".

The final episode of The Good Wife: "End" had a divided reaction among viewers and critics, with many praising a fitting ending to a complex character with others who argued of its ambiguity and absence of a conclusion - particularly with Alicia's love life. The finale drew controversy in its last scene when Diane Lockhart slaps Alicia Florrick after betraying her in court to save Peter from jail. Alicia is then left alone in a hallway before walking away to a future of uncertainty regarding her relationship with Jason, her career and political life. Vanity Fair noting "As Breaking Bad famously tracked the evolution of Walter White "from Mr. Chips to Scarface," The Good Wife followed Alicia as she evolved into Peter. The Kings claim the show was "moving in the direction where there wasn't much difference between who Alicia was and who her husband was. Is Alicia a villain or an anti-hero? It's hard to quite see her that way after all the good she's done for so many seasons. But the inclusion of Will Gardner in the finale momentarily humanizes Alicia while also highlighting the idea that Alicia's transformation into Peter has been a longtime coming", and claiming that "The show's incredible finale belongs to an earlier age of television". Emily Nussbaum of The New Yorker said "it was an ending that commanded respect". The episode received a huge backlash on social media and has been rated one of the lowest of the series on IMDB. In anticipation of a divided audience, Robert and Michelle King penned a letter to the fans explaining their creative decisions.

References

2015 American television seasons
2016 American television seasons
7